Vere Essex Cromwell, 4th Earl of Ardglass PC (I), (2 October 1625 – 26 November 1687) was an English nobleman, son of Thomas Cromwell, 1st Earl of Ardglass and Elizabeth Meverell. He was the last direct male descendant of Henry VIII's chief minister, and key architect of the English reformation, Thomas Cromwell.

Life
Vere Essex Cromwell was born at Throwleigh, Staffordshire and was educated at Trinity College, Dublin. He succeeded his nephew Thomas Cromwell as Earl of Ardglass and Viscount Lecale in the Peerage of Ireland in 1682, as well as Baron Cromwell in the Peerage of England. He died 26 November 1687 at his home in Booncastle, County Down and was buried 29 November at Downpatrick Abbey, County Down. On his death without male issue, all of his titles became extinct.

Marriage and issue
He married in 1672 Catherine Hamilton, widow of Richard Price, of, Greencastle, Kilkeel, County Down, daughter of James Hamilton, of Newcastle Kilcoo, County Down and Margaret Kynaston, of Saul, County Down, and by her, had an only daughter:
 Elizabeth Cromwell (c. 3 December 1674 – 31 March 1709) married Edward Southwell, (c. 1667 - 4 Dec 1730) and had a son, Edward (1 Jun 1705 - 16 Mar 1755)

References

Bibliography

External links 
 Ardglass, Earl of (I, 1645 - 1687) Cracroft's Peerage
 

1625 births
1687 deaths
Members of the Privy Council of Ireland
Vere Essex
Earls of Ardglass
Barons Cromwell
Alumni of Trinity College Dublin